Herbert Ellis may refer to:

Herb Ellis (actor) (1921–2018), American character actor and co-developer of series Dragnet
Herbert Ellis (RAF officer) (1893–?), British World War I flying ace
Herbert J. Ellis (1865–1903), banjo player, mandolinist, guitar player and composer
Herb Ellis (1921–2010), American jazz guitarist
Sir Doug Ellis (Herbert Douglas Ellis, 1924–2018), British entrepreneur, chairman of Aston Villa Football Club
Herbert Willoughby Ellis (1869–1943), British entomologist